Luca Sparandeo (born 18 August 1999) is an Italian professional footballer who plays as a leftback for  club Vibonese.

Club career
Sparandeo joined the Benevento youth academy in 2011. He made his professional debut for Benevento in a 0–2 Serie A loss to SPAL on 6 May 2018.

On 31 January 2019, he joined Serie C club Viterbese Castrense on loan.

On 20 July 2019, he joined Serie C club Virtus Francavilla on loan. The loan was renewed for the 2020–21 season on 12 September 2020.

On 25 August 2021, he joined Lecco on permanent basis.

For the 2022–23 season, Sparandeo signed with Vibonese in Serie D.

References

External links
 
 
 Serie A Profile

1999 births
Living people
Sportspeople from Benevento
Footballers from Campania
Italian footballers
Association football fullbacks
Serie A players
Serie B players
Serie C players
Benevento Calcio players
U.S. Viterbese 1908 players
Virtus Francavilla Calcio players
Calcio Lecco 1912 players
U.S. Vibonese Calcio players